The Anglican Diocese of Western Newfoundland is a diocese of the Ecclesiastical Province of Canada of the Anglican Church of Canada. It comprises 78 congregations grouped in 32 parishes in Newfoundland and Labrador, with approximately 24,000 souls. Most parishes are multipoint -with more than two congregations- with only one full-time clergy. As of 2012, the diocese had 20 full-time and over 350 lay ministers.

Bishops
William Legge (1976–1978; previously bishop suffragan in the Diocese of Newfoundland)
Stewart Payne (1978–1997); Metropolitan of Canada, 1990–1997
Len Whitten (1997–2003)
Percy Coffin (2003–2018); Metropolitan of Canada, 2014–2017
John Organ (2018–present)

Parishes
Parish Of All Saints,
Parish Of Bay Of Islands,
Parish Of Bay St. George,
Parish Of Bonne Bay North,
Parish Of Bonne Bay South,
Parish Of Burgeo,
Parish Of Cow Head,
Parish Of Cox's Cove/Mcivers,
Parish Of Daniel's Harbor,
Parish Of Deer Lake,
Parish Of Flowers Cove,
Parish Of Forteau,
Parish Of Grand Bay,
Parish Of Green Island,
Parish Of Isle Aux Morts,
Parish Of Meadows, 
Parish Of Pasadena/Cormack,
Parish Of Pisolet Bay,
Parish Of Plum Point,
Parish Of Port Saunders,
Parish Of Ramea,
Parish Of Rose Blanche,
Parish Of Seal Cove,
Parish Of St. Anthony,
Parish Of St. Augustine,
Parish Of St. James the Apostle,
Parish Of St. John The Evangelist,
Parish Of St. Luke,
Parish Of St. Mary The Virgin,
Parish Of St. Michael & All Angels,
Parish Of Stephenville Crossing,
Parish Of White Bay,

References

External links
Anglican Church of Canada official site
Diocese of Western Newfoundland official site

Western Newfoundland, Anglican Diocese of
Anglican Province of Canada